Clovis III was the Frankish king of Austrasia in 675 and possibly into 676. A member of the Merovingian dynasty, he was a child and his reign so brief and contested that he may be considered only a pretender. He is sometimes even left unnumbered and Clovis IV is instead called Clovis III. The only source for his reign is the contemporary Suffering of Leudegar.

Following the assassination of Childeric II in 675, the kingdoms of Austrasia and Neustria accepted different claimants. In Neustria, under the influence of Leudegar, bishop of Autun, Childeric's younger brother Theuderic III was installed as king. In Austrasia, Ebroin, the former mayor of the palace, installed Clovis III with support of a faction of the magnates opposed to the mayoralty of Wulfoald.

Ebroin and his allies claimed that Clovis was a son of Chlothar III, Childeric's older brother. The Suffering of Leudegar claims that this was a lie, although there is nothing implausible in it, since Chlothar was about twenty-three years old when he died. Nor is the naming of Clovis unusual, since firstborn sons in the Merovingian dynasty were often named after their grandfathers, and Chlothar's father was Clovis II. When Theuderic III had a son in 677, however, he named him Clovis (the future Clovis IV) and this may be taken as evidence that the Suffering is correct and his brother never had a son of that name.

Ebroin needed a legitimate Merovingian in order to raise an army and to issue legally binding orders (praecepta). (A generation later, the same requirement forced Charles Martel to find a Merovingian pretender, Chlothar IV, in 717.) Once raised, Ebroin marched the army into the northwest of the kingdom and seized the royal treasury in the fall of 675. Once he had secured control of the treasury, he no longer needed Clovis and he abandoned him, declaring himself for Theuderic III. Those Austrasians opposed to Ebroin and to union with Neustria, however, did not recognise Theuderic, and instead enthroned Dagobert II sometime between 2 April and 30 June 676.

There are some coins that have been attributed to the short reign of Clovis III. This attribution, first suggested by Jean Lafaurie in 1956, has been accepted by Egon Felder and Philip Grierson. A gold tremissis bearing the name CHLODOVIO RIX and the name of the moneyer, Eborino, probably belongs to him. Although it was possibly minted under Clovis IV, there is no evidence for the continuation of gold coinage in the Frankish kingdoms past the 670s. Likewise, late gold tremisses of Marseille bearing the name of Clovis probably belong to Clovis III. Stylistically, these have much in common with the coinage of Dagobert II, bearing the cross-on-steps motif on the reverse in imitation of Byzantine coinage.

Of the ultimate fate of Clovis III nothing is known.

References

Bibliography

External links
The Oxford Merovingian Page.

Merovingian kings
Year of birth unknown
Rois fainéants
7th-century Frankish kings